The 1958 WANFL season was the 74th season of senior football in Perth, Western Australia.

Ladder

Grand final

References

West Australian Football League seasons
WANFL